Abzal Zhumabaev (born 28 May 1986) is a Kazakhstani football defender who plays for the club FC Atyrau. He has also played for the Kazakhstan national football team.

Career
Zhumabaev began his career with FC Almaty, but joined Atyrau in 2009. His first season with the club was interrupted by injury and he only appeared in 14 league matches.

References

External links

Living people
1986 births
Kazakhstani footballers
Association football midfielders
Kazakhstan international footballers
FC Atyrau players